Waldbrunn is a town in the district of Neckar-Odenwald-Kreis, in Baden-Württemberg, Germany.

People 
 Theodor Leutwein (1849-1921), German colonial administrator
 Paul Steiner (born 1957), German football player
 Timo Bracht (born 1975), German athlete

References

Neckar-Odenwald-Kreis